Kishangarh railway station is a railway station in Ajmer district, Rajasthan. Its code is KSG. It serves Kishangarh city. The station consists of two platforms. Passenger, Express and Superfast trains halt here.

Trains

The following trains halt at Kishangarh railway station in both directions:

 Khajuraho–Udaipur City Express
 Udaipur City–Delhi Sarai Rohilla Chetak Superfast Express
 Ajmer–Sealdah Express
 Rajkot–Delhi Sarai Rohilla Weekly Express
 Bhavnagar Terminus–Delhi Sarai Rohilla Link Express
 Ahmedabad–Gorakhpur Express
 Jaipur–Hyderabad Weekly Express
 Ahmedabad–Haridwar Yoga Express
 Ahmedabad–Shri Mata Vaishno Devi Katra Express
 Ajmer–Delhi Sarai Rohilla Jan Shatabdi Express
 Ala Hazrat Express (via Bhildi)
 Ala Hazrat Express (via Ahmedabad)
 Bandra Terminus–Delhi Sarai Rohilla Express
 Bhopal–Jaipur Express
 Ajmer–Chandigarh Garib Rath Express
 Ajmer–Ernakulam Marusagar Superfast Express
 Udaipur City–Haridwar Express
 Ajmer–Amritsar Express (via Firozpur)
 Ajmer–Amritsar Express (via Dhuri)
 Bandra Terminus–Jaipur Amrapur Aravali Express
 Agra Fort–Ajmer Intercity Express
 Ajmer–Jammu Tawi Pooja Superfast Express
 Porbandar–Delhi Sarai Rohilla Express
 Udaipur City–Jaipur Intercity Express
 New Delhi–Daurai Shatabdi Express
 Nagpur–Jaipur Weekly Express
 Jaisalmer–Kathgodam Ranikhet Express
 Ajmer–Jabalpur Dayodaya Superfast Express
 Okha–Jaipur Weekly Express
 Ahmedabad–Lucknow Weekly Express
 Durg–Ajmer Express

References

Railway stations in Ajmer district
Jaipur railway division